Aoujeft or Oujeft is a town and commune in the Adrar Region of western Mauritania.

In 2000 it had a population of 6,019.

References

Communes of Adrar Region